Surrey Ambulance Service was the ambulance service for the County of Surrey in England until 1 July 2006, when it was succeeded by a South East Coast Ambulance Service also covering Sussex and Kent.

See also
 Emergency medical services in the United Kingdom

External links
 Official website

Defunct NHS trusts
Health in Surrey
History of Surrey
Defunct ambulance services in England